The Slovenian National Badminton Championships is a tournament organized to crown the best badminton players in Slovenia. The tournament started in 1958 and is held every year.

Past winners

References
Details of affiliated national organisations at Badminton Europe
Slovenia - Badmintonska zveza Slovenije

Badminton tournaments in Slovenia
National badminton championships
Sports competitions in Slovenia
Recurring sporting events established in 1958
1958 establishments in Yugoslavia
National championships in Slovenia